Nihonella is a monotypic genus of east Asian sheet weavers containing the single species, Nihonella chika. It was first described by F. Ballarin and T. Yamasaki in 2021, and it has only been found in Japan.

See also
 List of Linyphiidae species (I–P)

References

Monotypic Linyphiidae genera
Arthropods of Japan